Cristilabrum is a genus of air-breathing land snail, a terrestrial pulmonate gastropod mollusk in the family Camaenidae.

Species 
This genus contains the following species:
 Cristilabrum bubulum
 Cristilabrum buryillum
 Cristilabrum grossum
 Cristilabrum isolatum
 Cristilabrum monodon
 Cristilabrum primum
 Cristilabrum rectum
 Cristilabrum simplex
 Cristilabrum solitudum
 Cristilabrum spectaculum

References 

 
Camaenidae
Taxonomy articles created by Polbot